Jane Shaw (born 1963) is a British historian and Anglican priest.

Jane Shaw may also refer to:

 Jane Shaw (Scottish author) (1910–2000), Scottish author of books and short stories for children and young adults
 Jane S. Shaw, American free-market environmentalist, editor and journalist

See also
 Jane Shore (disambiguation)